Harry Bertram Hawthorn, OC (15 October 1910 – 29 July 2006) was a Canadian anthropologist and museum curator.  He is well known for his work with the coastal First Nations of British Columbia.

Hawthorn was born in Wellington, New Zealand and studied at Victoria University College (B.Sc. & M.Sc.), then Auckland University College (B.A.), (the degrees were issued by the University of New Zealand), and Yale University (Ph.D.). His first fieldwork experiences were with the Māori of New Zealand and in Peru.

He joined the faculty of the University of British Columbia in 1947, founded its anthropology program, championed the legitimacy of Northwest Coast Indian art as high art, and, along with his wife and colleague Audrey Hawthorn, was the driving force behind the establishment of UBC's world-class Museum of Anthropology.  He was an early champion of Northwest Coast artists such as Mungo Martin and Bill Reid.

Bibliography

 Hawthorn, Audrey (1993) A Labour of Love: The Making of the Museum of Anthropology, UBC: The First Three Decades, 1947-1976.  Vancouver: UBC Museum of Anthropology.

External links
UBC Archives - Harry Hawthorn
UBC Archives - Honorary Degree Citations 1972-1980

2006 deaths
1910 births
Canadian anthropologists
New Zealand emigrants to Canada
Officers of the Order of Canada
University of Auckland alumni
Victoria University of Wellington alumni
Yale University alumni
Academic staff of the University of British Columbia
20th-century anthropologists